The 2013 Women's Pan American Cup was the fourth edition of the Women's Pan American Cup, the quadrennial international women's field hockey championship of the Americas organised by the Pan American Hockey Federation. It was held between 21 and 28 September 2013 in Mendoza, Argentina.

The tournament doubled as the qualifier for two major international tournaments: the winner would qualify directly to the 2014 Hockey World Cup, and the three teams not qualifying through the 2014 South American Championship or the 2014 Central American and Caribbean Games would qualify for the 2015 Pan American Games to be held in Toronto, Canada.

Argentina won the tournament for the fourth consecutive time after defeating the United States 1–0 in the final. As they had already secured an automatic berth at the 2014 Hockey World Cup to defend their title obtained in 2010 thanks to a third-place finish at the World League Semifinal in London, England, their quota was immediately awarded to third reserve team, the United States.

Qualification
In early 2011 the Pan American Hockey Federation (PAHF) announced a new qualification system for Pan American Cup, recognizing the differences in team strength of the top playing nations and the remaining associations. The top six nations at the 2009 Pan American Cup now will qualify directly with the remaining two spots being taken at the newly created Pan American Challenge, which was held in 2011 in Rio de Janeiro, Brazil.

Umpires
Below are the 10 umpires appointed by the Pan American Hockey Federation:

Frances Block (ENG)
Mary Driscoll (USA)
Ayanna McClean (TRI)
Meghan McLennan (CAN)
Maritza Pérez Castro (URU)
Megan Robertson (CAN)
Maricel Sánchez (ARG)
Leila Sacre (CAN)
Suzie Sutton (USA)
Verónica Villafañe (ARG)

Results
All times are Argentina Time (UTC−03:00)

First round
 Advanced to semi-finals

Pool A

Pool B

Fifth to eighth place classification

Cross-overs

Seventh and eighth place

Fifth and sixth place

First to fourth place classification

Semi-finals

Third and fourth place

Final

Statistics

Final standings

Awards

See also
2013 Men's Pan American Cup

References

External links
Official website

Women's Pan American Cup
Pan American Cup
International women's field hockey competitions hosted by Argentina
Pan American Cup
Sport in Mendoza, Argentina
Field hockey
Pan American Cup
Pan American Cup